Maincha   is a village in Gautam Budh Nagar district, Uttar Pradesh, India. It is surrounded by the villages of Rithori and Boraki.  It is the biggest village of Bhatner region. It is adjacent to National Highway 2.

The majority of the population are from the Gurjar community.The nearest railway station is Ajayabpur, Uttar Pradesh.

References

Villages in Gautam Buddh Nagar district